Hữu Sản may refer to several places in Vietnam, including:

Hữu Sản, Bắc Giang, a commune of Sơn Động District
Hữu Sản, Hà Giang, a commune of Bắc Quang District